The surname Santayana may refer to

George Santayana (1863-1952), a Spanish-American philosopher
Antonio Gutiérrez de Otero y Santayana (1729-1799), a Spanish Lieutenant General best known for repelling Admiral Nelson's attack on Santa Cruz de Tenerife in 1797

Spanish-language surnames